The Commandant Rivière class was a class of frigates built for the French Navy in the late 1950s and early 1960s. Labeled "aviso-escorteur" (fr: "sloop-escort"), they were designed to perform the role of overseas patrol in peacetime and anti-submarine escort in wartime. This vessel class is named after the French Navy officer Henri Rivière (1827–1883).

Design

The main gun armament of the Commandant Rivière class consisted of three of the new French  guns, with a single turret located forward and two turrets aft. These water-cooled automatic dual-purpose guns could fire a  shell at an effective range of  against surface targets and  against aircraft at a rate of 60 rounds per minute. Two triple torpedo tubes were fitted for anti-submarine torpedoes, while the ship's armament was completed by two  Hotchkiss HS-30 cannon. The ships had accommodation for an 80-man commando detachment with two fast landing boats, each capable of landing 25 personnel.

Two ships of the class were fitted with modified power plants. Balny omitted one 100 mm gun turret to accommodate the revised machinery.

Operational history
The first ship to have been commissioned, but the second in her class, after Commandant Rivière, the prototype and lead ship of the series, was Victor Schœlcher, which entered service in October 1962, with all but one of the class following in the next 27 months. The exception was the CODAG powered Balny, which although launched in 1962 and completed in 1964, did not commission until 1970, being employed as a trials ship in the meantime.

Commandant Bourdais was used for fishery protection in the North Atlantic from 1963 to 1972, while several of the ships of the class were used as training ships, including Victor Schœlcher (1961–1973) and Commandant Bourdais. In the 1970s, all except Balny had one 100 mm turret replaced by four MM 38 Exocet anti-ship missile launchers, while several of the ships had their 30 mm cannon replaced by Bofors  guns.

In 1984–1985, Commandant Rivière was converted to a sonar-trials ship. The ship's armament was replaced by a single 40 mm Bofors gun and two  machine guns, while the ship's stern was rebuilt to accommodate a hoist for a variable depth sonar, which was used to test various active and passive towed array sonars.

All French units were decommissioned in the early 1990s, save for three frigates that were sold to the Uruguayan Navy.

Ships

All French ships were built by Arsenal de Lorient

See also
 List of Escorteurs of the French Navy

Notes

References
 
 
 
 
 
 
 

Frigate classes
Cold War frigates of France
 
Ship classes of the French Navy